Westerveld is a municipality in the northeastern Netherlands.

The municipality Westerveld was established in 1998 out of the municipalities of Diever, Dwingeloo, Havelte, and Vledder.
Westerveld is crossed by a channel, the Drentsche Hoofdvaart. There are also two National Parks situated in the municipality, the Drents-Friese Wold and Dwingelerveld.

Population centres 

Dwingeloo is a town halfway between Meppel and Assen.

Topography

Dutch Topographic map of the municipality of Westerveld, 2013.

Notable people 

 Sicco Mansholt (1908 in Ulrum – 1995) politician, 4th President of the European Commission 1972-1973
 John Hugenholtz (1914 in Vledder – 1995) designer of race tracks and cars
 Jan Pol (born 1942 in Wateren) veterinarian, & TV Personality
 Jan Mulder (born 1943 in Diever) politician and Member of the European Parliament 
 Klaske Hiemstra (born 1954 in Vledder) a West Frisian-language writer
 Maarten Treurniet (born 1959) film director, brought up in Dwingeloo 
 Merlijn Twaalfhoven (born 1976 in Wapserveen) Dutch composer

Sport 
 Gerrit Postma (1894 in Vledderveen – 1969) discus thrower, competed at the 1928 Summer Olympics
 Tollien Schuurman (1913 in Zorgvlied – 1994) sprint runner, competed at the 1932 Summer Olympics
 Riëtte Fledderus (born 1977) retired volleyball player, competed at the 1996 Summer Olympics

Gallery

References

External links
Official website

 
Municipalities of Drenthe
Municipalities of the Netherlands established in 1998